Calliostoma angolense is a species of sea snail, a marine gastropod mollusk in the family Calliostomatidae.

Description

Distribution
This species occurs in the Atlantic Ocean off Angola.

References

 Bouchet, P.; Fontaine, B. (2009). List of new marine species described between 2002-2006. Census of Marine Life

Endemic fauna of Angola
angolense
Gastropods described in 2006